Gary B. Born (born 14 September 1955) is an international lawyer and academic. He is chair of the International Arbitration and International Litigation practices at the international law firm, Wilmer Cutler Pickering Hale and Dorr LLP, and the author of a number of commentaries, casebooks and other works on international arbitration and litigation.

Early life 
Born attended primary schools in France and Germany and completed his secondary education in the US. He received a bachelor's degree summa cum laude from Haverford College in 1978 and a J.D., summa cum laude from the University of Pennsylvania Law School in 1981.

Born served as a law clerk to Henry Friendly of the U.S. Court of Appeals for the Second Circuit (1981–1982) and William Rehnquist of the U.S. Supreme Court (1982–1983). Born has practiced with Wilmer Cutler Pickering Hale and Dorr LLP in London for the past three decades and has taught international dispute resolution at law schools in Europe, the United States and Asia.

Academic influence on international dispute resolution
Born has published numerous works in the fields of both international arbitration and international litigation. These works have contributed to the development of both areas as independent fields of legal study and practice.

Born’s treatise on International Commercial Arbitration is cited as the standard text in the field of international arbitration. International Commercial Arbitration provides a  treatment of the subject of international commercial arbitration and proposes theories regarding the global legal regime for international arbitration and the constitutional status of the 1958 New York Convention (United Nations Convention on Recognition and Enforcement of Foreign Arbitral Awards).

Born has also written on international litigation. His commentary and materials on International Civil Litigation in United States Courts is in its fifth edition. The work is a reference work on international litigation and is credited with having created the field in the United States: "[w]hen the first edition appeared, it broke new ground...[It was the] first case book on transnational litigation in the United States, and the first reference work in this area with its level of analytical depth and breadth of coverage." International Civil Litigation is frequently relied upon by US judicial decisions, including the US Supreme Court and various Courts of Appeals.

Born has also authored casebooks on international arbitration (including International Arbitration: Cases and Materials (Aspen 2010) and International Commercial Arbitration: Commentary and Materials (Kluwer 2001)) and works on international dispute resolution (including International Arbitration and Forum Selection Agreements: Drafting and Enforcing (Kluwer 4th ed. 2013) and International Arbitration: Law and Practice (Kluwer 2012)).

Born's treatise International Commercial Arbitration was awarded the American Society of International Law's Certificate of Merit for 2010 and was voted the 2009 "IDR-Related Book of the Year" by the Oil-Gas-Energy-Mining-Infrastructure Dispute Management (OGEMID) network. Born again received the OGEMID "Book of the Year" award in 2010 for his International Arbitration and Forum Selection Agreements: Drafting and Enforcing.

Representations
Born is an advocate in the fields of international arbitration, international litigation and public international law. He has participated in more than 600 international arbitrations, including several of the largest institutional and ad hoc arbitrations in recent decades (see below). In 2006, Born was chosen by his peers as the "World's Best International Litigator" in a survey by Legal Media Group. Born was the recipient of the inaugural "Advocate of the Year" award by the Global Arbitration Review in 2011 and the ILO Client Choice Award for International Arbitration Lawyer of the Year in 2012 and 2014.

Born has represented a diversity of clients. Born has represented multinational corporate groups in a number of major international commercial and other arbitrations during the past decade. These included disputes involving Deutsche Telekom and Vivendi and France Telecom, Repsol and Atlantic LNG 2/3, Shell Petroleum, Volkswagen, and others.

Born acted as lead counsel in the Abyei Arbitration, conducted under the auspices of the Permanent Court of Arbitration in the Hague at the Peace Palace. He represented the Sudan People's Liberation Movement/Army ("SPLM/A") in the arbitration, implementing the 2005 Comprehensive Peace Agreement, between the Government of Sudan and SPLM/A. The Abyei Arbitration had its oral hearings being open to the public and web-cast live around the world. Born’s closing submissions in the Arbitration and the Tribunal Award can be viewed on the PCA’s website. Born represented the State of Eritrea against Yemen in an arbitration under PCA auspices concerning territorial sovereignty over a number of islands in the Red Sea. Born also represented Greenpeace in an arbitration against the Republic of France, concerning the Rainbow Warrior incident. The arbitration concluded with an award of damages in favor of Greenpeace.

Born has sat as arbitrator in institutional and ad hoc arbitrations, including both international commercial and investment arbitrations. Born was a member of the arbitral tribunal in Biwater Gauff v. Republic of Tanzania, which issued an order setting forth guidelines on transparency and confidentiality in investor-state arbitrations.

Professional and academic activities
Born has taught courses on international arbitration, international litigation or public international law at Harvard Law School, Stanford Law School, St. Gallen University, National University of Singapore, University of Peking, Tsinghua University, Georgetown University Law Center, University of Virginia School of Law and elsewhere. Born was named the inaugural Kwa Geok Choo Distinguished Visitor in 2012 at the National University of Singapore's Law School, and has been invited to deliver the James E.C. Brierley Memorial Lecture at McGill University and the Goff Arbitration Lecture at the City University of Hong Kong.  He has also been awarded honorary titles by leading universities, including St. Gallen (Professor) and Wayne State University (Doctor of Laws).  Mr. Born received the Haverford College Alumni Distinguished Achievement Award in 2013.

Born is a member of the American Law Institute and has served on the Executive Council of the American Society of International Law, and as co-chair of the ABA International Section, Committee on International Aspects of Litigation. He also is a member of the Advisory Committee for the ALI’s Restatement of International Commercial Arbitration, the ALI's Restatement (Fourth) of Foreign Relations Law, the Board of Trustees of the British Institute of International and Comparative Law, the Academic Council of the Institute for Transnational Arbitration, the Advisory Board of the African International Legal Awareness, the International Advisory Board of the Hong Kong International Arbitration Centre, and the Indian Journal of Arbitration Law. Mr. Born is a member of the Court of the Singapore International Arbitration Centre and a Vice-President of the American Society of International Law.

Principal publications

Books
 International Arbitration: Law and Practice (Kluwer 2012)
 International Arbitration: Cases and Materials (Aspen 2010)
 International Commercial Arbitration (Kluwer 2009)
 International Commercial Arbitration: Commentary and Materials (Kluwer 2d ed. 2001) (Kluwer 1st ed. 1996)
 International Arbitration and Forum Selection Agreements: Planning, Drafting and Enforcing (Kluwer 4th ed. 2013) (Kluwer 3d ed. 2010) (Kluwer 2d ed. 2006) (Kluwer 1st ed. 1999)
 International Civil Litigation in United States Courts (Kluwer 6th ed. 2018) (5th ed. 2011) (4th ed. 2006) (with Bo Rutledge) (3d ed. 1996) (2d ed.1992) (1st ed. 1989)
 The Extraterritorial Application of National Laws (1987) (with D. Lange)

See also 
 List of law clerks of the Supreme Court of the United States (Seat 9)

Notes

References 

1955 births
20th-century American lawyers
21st-century American lawyers
American expatriates in England
Arbitrators
Haverford College alumni
International law scholars
Law clerks of the Supreme Court of the United States
Litigators
Living people
Lawyers from London
University of Pennsylvania Law School alumni
Wilmer Cutler Pickering Hale and Dorr people
Members of the American Law Institute